Valerie Stead is a former international lawn bowler from Jersey.

Bowls career
In 1995, she won the triples bronze medal at the Atlantic Bowls Championships with Denise Falkner and Jean Jones.

She has represented Jersey at the Commonwealth Games, in the singles at the 1994 Commonwealth Games.

References

Jersey female bowls players
Bowls players at the 1994 Commonwealth Games
Living people
Commonwealth Games competitors for Jersey
Year of birth missing (living people)